The West Lancashire Football League is a football competition based in northern England, consisting of five divisions – three for first teams (Premier, One and Two), and two for reserve teams. The league is currently sponsored by Lancaster-based radio station The Bay. The top division, the Premier Division, sits at step seven of the National League System and is a feeder league for the North West Counties Football League, although promotion and relegation is based upon application to the National League System Panel.

History
The league was formed in 1904, although 1905–06 was the first season. It was originally known as the Preston & District Combination, with member clubs having to be within ten miles of Preston. It became the West Lancashire League in 1908, and over the years the qualification area was gradually extended. At first it was a competition for minor non-league football clubs, but from the 1920s the membership changed with the league including several Football League club's 'A' teams. This continued through to the early 1950s. However, the creation of the Lancashire League meant that some of the Football League clubs changed their allegiance. The West Lancashire League struggled along for a few years, until 1954 when it was closed down.

The league was re-established in 1959, with a small membership of clubs from the Blackpool area. Steadily the league grew, and in 1964–65 it expanded to two divisions. The league had a rapidly changing membership, but continued to prosper, with a third senior division being formed for the 1998–99 season. The league now covers the whole of modern Lancashire, plus areas of Cumbria, Greater Manchester, Merseyside, and even West Yorkshire.

In past seasons the league has included former Football League club Nelson and the forerunners of current Football League side Morecambe.

Current members (2021-22)
The constitution for season 2021-22 is as follows:

Premier Division
Blackpool Wren Rovers
Burscough Richmond
CMB
Coppull United
Euxton Villa 
Fulwood Amateurs
Hurst Green
Lytham Town
Poulton
Slyne-with-Hest
Southport Hesketh
Tempest United
Thornton Cleveleys
Turton
Vickerstown
Whitehaven

Division One
Askam United
Carnforth Rangers
Crooklands Casuals
Croston Sports
Eagley
Haslingden St Mary's
Hawcoat Park
Hesketh Bank
Horwich St Mary's
Kendal County
Lostock St. Gerards
Millom
Milnthorpe Corinthians
Stoneclough
Ulverston Rangers
Wyre Villa

Division Two
Burnley United
Cartmel & District
Charnock Richard Reserves
Chipping
Dalton United
Freckleton
Furness Rovers
Galgate
Garstang Reserves
Kendal United
Rossendale UTFM
Storeys of Lancaster
Walney Island

West Lancashire League Champions

Member clubs progressing to higher standard leagues

References

External links

League site at FA Full-Time

 
1904 establishments in England
Football leagues in England
Football in Lancashire
Football in Cumbria
Sports leagues established in 1904